Magallanes station is an elevated Manila Metro Rail Transit (MRT) station situated on Line 3. The station is named after the adjacent Magallanes district of Makati, which in turn is named after Ferdinand Magellan, who discovered the Philippines for Spain on April 15, 1521. Although the station is named after Magallanes, it also serves passengers from Kayamanan-C and barangays Dasmariñas, Pio del Pilar, and San Lorenzo in Makati, and those from Taguig.

The station is the twelfth station for trains headed to Taft Avenue and the second station for trains headed to North Avenue. It is the last station in Makati before it crosses over to Pasay.

Nearby landmarks
The station is the closest MRT station to the South Luzon Expressway, as well as to Chino Roces Avenue. It is also located near Dasmariñas Village and Ecology Village, two major residential areas in the Makati area. It is also close to some prominent business headquarters and institutions, such as those of the Philippine operations of Levi's and GlaxoSmithKline, schools such as Asia Pacific College, Assumption College, Don Bosco Technical Institute, Makati Hope Christian School, and Colegio San Agustin-Makati and shopping centers such as Makati Cinema Square (near Don Bosco) and the upscale Magallanes Center. The station is directly connected to Alphaland Southgate Mall and Tower, Teleperformance Building within the building, and San Lorenzo Place Mall.

Transportation links
The transport terminal outside the station serves tricycles, taxis, jeepneys, and buses. Buses that ply the EDSA and South Luzon Expressway routes (both city and provincial) stop near the station. Passengers may board jeepneys under the Magallanes Interchange, wherein these go to various locations in Metro Manila, such as northern and western Makati, Makati Central Business District, Taguig, Pasay, Parañaque, and Muntinlupa. Taxis are also available near the station, and the taxi stands are located along with the bus stops near the station on both northbound and southbound lanes of EDSA.

Passengers may also take a short walk to EDSA railway station, located below the Magallanes Interchange and west of Chino Roces Avenue, to take the PNR Metro Commuter Line.

Gallery

See also
List of rail transit stations in Metro Manila
MRT Line 3 (Metro Manila)

Manila Metro Rail Transit System stations
Railway stations opened in 2000
Buildings and structures in Makati